Rätten att älska is a 1956 Swedish drama film directed by Mimi Pollak.

Cast
 Stig Järrel as Bernhard Borg
 Märta Dorff as Margareta Borg
 Pia Skoglund as Berit Borg
 Ingemar Pallin as Lennart Borg
 Sten Gester as Arne Lindgren
 Carin Cederlund as Lilly Sund
 Catrin Westerlund as Ulla Winge
 Anna-Lisa Baude as Maria Larsson
 Sven-Eric Gamble as Julle Larsson
 Meg Westergren as Julle's Fiancée
 Max von Sydow as Bergman
 Börje Mellvig as Wallin
 Hans Strååt as Söderberg

References

External links
 

1956 films
1956 drama films
Swedish drama films
1950s Swedish-language films
1950s Swedish films
Swedish black-and-white films